Mestolobes minuscula is a moth of the family Crambidae described by Arthur Gardiner Butler in 1881. It is endemic to the Hawaiian islands of Kauai, Oahu, Molokai, Maui, Lanai and Hawaii.

External links

Crambinae
Moths described in 1881
Endemic moths of Hawaii